Careggine is a town and comune in the province of Lucca, in northern Tuscany (Italy). It  is the birthplace of Italian football player Marco Tardelli and of Adriano Tardelli, one of the heroes of the Italian resistance movement.

References

Cities and towns in Tuscany